James Vincent is a Nigerian basketball coach of the Nigerian national team, which he coached at the 2017 Women's Afrobasket. The team won Group B of the competition and beat Senegal, 65-48, in the championship game of the knockout stage to win the tournament.

References

Nigerian basketball coaches
Living people
Year of birth missing (living people)
Place of birth missing (living people)